The 1899–1900 season was Manchester City F.C.'s ninth season of league football and first season in the First Division of the Football League.

Team Kit

Football League First Division

Results summary

Reports

FA Cup

Squad statistics

Squad
Appearances for competitive matches only

Scorers

All

League

FA Cup

See also
Manchester City F.C. seasons

References

External links
Extensive Manchester City statistics site

1899-1900
English football clubs 1899–1900 season